Parliamentary elections were held in the Comoros on 22 March 1987. The result was a victory for the Comorian Union for Progress, the sole legal party, which won all 42 seats in the first round of voting. Voter turnout was around 65%.

Electoral system
There were 42 constituencies (increased from 38), each of which elected a single member: 20 on Grande Comore, 16 on Anjouan and 6 on Mohéli.

Results

References

Elections in the Comoros
One-party elections
1987 in the Comoros
Comoros
1987